This is a list of the episodes of the American animated children's television program 64 Zoo Lane.

Series overview

Original Series

Pilot (1994)

Series 1 (1999)
 Note 1: This is the first season to be traditionally animated.
 Note 2: This is the only season to use cel animation.
 Note 3: This is the first season is used in the American English version by Lobster Films.

Series 2 (2000)
 Note 1: This is the last season to be traditionally animated.
 Note 2: This is the only season to use digital ink-and-paint animation.
 Note 3: This is the last season is used in the American English version by Lobster Films.

Reboot Series

Series 3 (2010–11)
 Note: This is the first season to be animated in the Adobe Flash format using Adobe Animate.

Series 4 (2012–13)
 Note: This is the last season to be animated in the Adobe Flash format using Adobe Animate, as well as being the final season of 64 Zoo Lane.

Lists of British children's television series episodes
Lists of French television series episodes